Hugh O'Connell (August 4, 1898 – January 19, 1943) was an American film actor and performed on Broadway.

Filmography

References

Bibliography
 Fleming, E.J. Carole Landis: A Tragic Life in Hollywood''. McFarland, 2005.

External links

Internet Broadway Database
Billboard Jan 30, 1943 Biography

1898 births
1943 deaths
American male film actors
Male actors from New York City
20th-century American male actors